The 1975 World Archery Championships was the 28th edition of the event. It was held in Interlaken, Switzerland on 25–28 June 1975 and was organised by World Archery Federation (FITA).

Medals summary

Recurve

Medals table

References

External links
 World Archery website

World Championship
World Archery
World Archery Championships
International archery competitions hosted by Switzerland